Vitali Mikhailovich Yeremeyev (born September 23, 1975) is a Kazakhstani former professional ice hockey goaltender. He played 4 games in the National Hockey League with the New York Rangers during the 2000–01 season. The rest of his career, which lasted from 1992 to 2014, was spent in the Russian Superleague and Kontinental Hockey League. Internationally Yeremeyev played for the Kazakhstani national team at several World Championships and the 1998 and 2006 Winter Olympics.

Playing career

Yeremeyev was drafted the 9th round (209th overall) in the 1994 NHL Entry Draft by the New York Rangers after his third season with Torpedo Ust-Kamenogorsk in which he won the Kazakhstan Hockey Championship's award for best goalie. He then played three seasons with CSKA Moscow, posting an incredible 1.66 GAA in 25 games during 1995-96. He bounced around the leagued a bit for the next few seasons, playing with Lokomotiv Yaroslavl and CSKA Moscow before landing with Dynamo Moscow.

In 2000, he powered the club to a league title, posting a 1.24 GAA in 26 games during the regular season, and a stunning 1.27 GAA during the playoffs. The next year, he got a shot at the National Hockey League with the Rangers, but was unable to replicate his performance and returned to Russia with Dynamo Moscow.

In 2004-05, he won the Russian Superleague title again with Moscow, as well as the league's award for best goalie. Impressively, he managed to post an even better GAA in this season's playoff effort, starting 10 games and averaging just .90 goals against per game. He played another five years with Dynamo Moscow, until he was traded to Barys Astana in 2010.

International play

Yeremeyev has competed for Kazakhstan more times than any other goalie in the country's history by far. In the 1994 World Championships, he was Evgeni Nabokov's teammate for the three years with Torpedo Ust-Kamenogorsk as well as the lone international competition that Nabokov represented Kazakhstan. He has competed at two Olympics as well as 10 World Championships.

Yeremeyev's top international performance came at the 1998 Winter Olympics, where he carried an upstart Kazakhstan team all the way to the quarterfinals where Team Canada beat them 4–1.

Career statistics

Regular season and playoffs

International

Awards and achievements
Russian Superleague: 1999–00, 2004–05 (with Dynamo Moscow)
IIHF European Champions Cup: 2006 (with Dynamo Moscow)
Spengler Cup: 2008 (with Dynamo Moscow)
Golden Helmet Award: 1999–00, 2004–05

References

External links 

1975 births
Living people
Asian Games gold medalists for Kazakhstan
Asian Games medalists in ice hockey
Barys Nur-Sultan players
Charlotte Checkers (1993–2010) players
Expatriate ice hockey players in Russia
Hartford Wolf Pack players
HC CSKA Moscow players
HC Dynamo Moscow players
Ice hockey players at the 1998 Winter Olympics
Ice hockey players at the 2006 Winter Olympics
Ice hockey players at the 2011 Asian Winter Games
Kazakhstani expatriate ice hockey people
Kazakhstani ice hockey goaltenders
Kazakhstani people of Russian descent
Kazzinc-Torpedo players
Lokomotiv Yaroslavl players
Medalists at the 2011 Asian Winter Games
New York Rangers draft picks
New York Rangers players
Olympic ice hockey players of Kazakhstan
Sportspeople from Oskemen
Expatriate ice hockey players in the United States
Kazakhstani expatriate sportspeople in the United States
Kazakhstani expatriate sportspeople in Russia